Lawnton is an unincorporated area and census-designated place (CDP) in Swatara Township, Dauphin County, Pennsylvania, United States. The population was 3,813 at the 2010 census. It is part of the Harrisburg–Carlisle Metropolitan Statistical Area.

Geography
Lawnton is located in southern Dauphin County at  (40.261439, -76.803047). It is in northern Swatara Township and is bordered to the east by the community of Rutherford. Interstate 83 forms the western edge of the CDP.

Demographics

As of the census of 2000, there were 3,787 people, 1,581 households, and 1,054 families residing in the CDP. The population density was 3,342.3 people per square mile (1,294.0/km). There were 1,630 housing units at an average density of 1,438.6/sq mi (556.9/km). The racial makeup of the CDP was 80.09% White, 14.44% African American, 0.08% Native American, 1.77% Asian, 1.35% from other races, and 2.27% from two or more races. Hispanic or Latino of any race were 3.80% of the population.

There were 1,581 households, out of which 33.0% had children under the age of 18 living with them, 48.6% were married couples living together, 14.1% had a female householder with no husband present, and 33.3% were non-families. 28.7% of all households were made up of individuals, and 10.1% had someone living alone who was 65 years of age or older. The average household size was 2.38 and the average family size was 2.92.

In the CDP, the population was spread out, with 25.0% under the age of 18, 8.1% from 18 to 24, 33.2% from 25 to 44, 20.8% from 45 to 64, and 12.9% who were 65 years of age or older. The median age was 37 years. For every 100 females, there were 88.0 males. For every 100 females age 18 and over, there were 84.2 males.

The median income for a household in the CDP was $49,737, and the median income for a family was $57,003. Males had a median income of $42,038 versus $29,125 for females. The per capita income for the CDP was $24,342. About 6.9% of families and 7.4% of the population were below the poverty line, including 11.3% of those under age 18 and 8.4% of those age 65 or over.

References

Harrisburg–Carlisle metropolitan statistical area
Census-designated places in Dauphin County, Pennsylvania
Census-designated places in Pennsylvania